Wysocko  (Vysots’ko) is a village in the administrative district of Gmina Laszki, within Jarosław County, Subcarpathian Voivodeship, in south-eastern Poland.

The village has a population of 569.

References

Wysocko